Shannon Block (born February 27, 1979) is the former president and CEO of Denver Zoo and World Forward, as well as a former health care CEO, former chief business development officer, chief operating officer and chief digital officer.  Block serves on numerous Boards, including serving as the past chairman of the Women's Forum of Colorado and regional director of Young Presidents' Organization.  She also serves as a board director of the International Women's Forum.  In her spare time she blogs about innovative tech and writes books.

Biography 
Block was born and grew up in Edina, Minnesota, the only child of two physicians. When she graduated, she was voted "Most likely to become a Billionaire." However, Block chose to spend her time not with the movers and shakers, but the moved and the shaken. Her nickname was "Shiny" because of her contagious smile. Dr. Block attended Edina High School and then graduated from George Washington University in 2001 with a B.S. in physics and B.S. in applied mathematics. After graduating from George Washington, Block moved to Boston to pursue a M.S. in physics from Tufts University and graduated in 2003. She later completed her doctorate in computer science with a speciality in big data and information security risk management effectiveness. Dr. Block moved to Colorado to take a job at Wild Oats Corporate Office but leveraged her transferrable skills to become a data management consultant at PricewaterhouseCoopers. Next Dr. Block became a senior manager at Deloitte, where she developed a specialty in global innovation.  She then became the chief business development officer at Denver Health Medical Center and then became the CEO of Rocky Mountain Cancer centers overseeing 21 locations across Colorado.  Block was then recruited to become the president and CEO of Denver Zoo, which serves over 2.3 million guests annually and directs the zoo's robust international conservation program. Block also founded the World Forward Foundation that has championed several global health initiatives for those exposed to nuclear radiation. Block is currently the executive director and chief digital officer for the Markle Foundation. She also volunteers her time instructing advanced computer science classes at Arapahoe Community College.

Board service 
Block has served on numerous boards, including Young Presidents' Organization, International Elephants Foundation, VISIT Denver, Women's Forum, Children's Hospital Quality & Safety, CEO's Against Cancer, Go Red for Women, Presbyterian St. Luke's Medical Center Advisory Council, Colorado Cancer Research Program, Justice Reskill and Data Management International.  Block is also a member of the Young Presidents Organization, Colorado Concern and Colorado Forum.  She has also served as a judge several times for nationwide philanthropic organizations awarding multi-million dollar gifts. 

1979 births
American women chief executives
Columbian College of Arts and Sciences alumni
Tufts University School of Arts and Sciences alumni
Living people
Edina High School alumni